Camp Ramah in the Poconos is a summer camp affiliated with the National Ramah Commission. Opened in 1950, it is located in the Pocono Mountains in High Lake, Pennsylvania (but is addressed in Lakewood, Pennsylvania, since High Lake does not have its own post office or ZIP code).

As with other Ramah camps, Camp Ramah in the Poconos is focused on Jewish education. Its program has an educational focus and includes Zionism, the Jewish lifecycle, and ritual. The camp seeks to maintain a connection with the State of Israel and uses Hebrew as the language of official instruction, communication, and education. The official prayer book of Camp Ramah in the Poconos is Siddur Lev Yisrael, authored by former director Cheryl Magen.

History
In the 1950s, Hebrew was the official spoken language at Ramah. At an alumni reunion in 2009, former campers, in their seventies, recalled phrases they had learned at Ramah like “Let’s go swimming,” or “Please pass the salt.”

Divisions (edot)
Campers are split up into divisions by grade and age. These divisions are called Edot, the plural of the word Edah (עדה) which means group in Hebrew. The Edot which are at Ramah Poconos are:

Each Edah is led by a Rosh Edah (Unit Head) who supervises the counselors in each individual bunk.

After the two 4-week sessions conclude, the camp runs the Tikvah Family Camp. A camp experience for the entire family for families with Jewish children with developmental disorders and/or social learning disorders. The program offers parents, and their siblings the unique opportunity to together experience the magic of Jewish summer camp. The overnight program incorporates Jewish learning, recreation, spiritual reflection, and plain-old-fun in the beautiful natural environment of Camp Ramah in the Poconos.

Staff

The staff of Ramah Poconos is composed largely of former Ramah campers. Many campers to return as counselors and specialists for several summers while they are in college. After college, they can continue to come back as the head of the age groups or in other positions. Camp Ramah encourages new recruits and give staff members who recruit others a bonus payment. Staff are trained on a perpetual basis throughout the summer beginning with the week before the campers come. This "staff week" is named after and funded by an endowment in honor of Director Emeritus, Cheryl Magen. It is spent drilling safety procedures, camp rules, activity planning, and many other important things into the staff members.  Throughout the summer, counselors and other staff members have Hadracha, (transliteration of הדרכה the Hebrew word for guidance) sessions that continue to train the staff in all necessary areas. Senior counselors are expected to mentor the junior counselors, so their Hadracha sessions spend a lot of focus on how to teach the younger counselors.

Mishlakhat
In addition to the regular staff, Ramah Poconos, together with the Jewish Agency for Israel, brings 40–50 Israeli staff members to camp each summer. These Israelis are a full part of the camp and participate in all areas of the camp. By contributing to the immersive environment of the camp, Israeli staff members enhance the quality of Jewish education at Ramah Poconos.

Activities
The campers are permitted to choose two regular activities, like arts and crafts, Radio Ramah (WCRP), teva (nature), mitbachon (baking and cooking), creative dramatics, and many others. Some sports available for campers include basketball, baseball, tennis, soccer, hockey, softball, volleyball, archery, and flag football.

Additionally, Ramah Poconos offers many opportunities for campers to express their creativity within the context of Judaism. The camp drama program puts on several plays each summer, all of which are performed entirely in Hebrew. The arts and crafts building has plenty of opportunities for painting, drawing, ceramics, and other forms of artistic expression.   The music program gives singing lessons to the campers about 2–3 times a week and often offers additional musical activities, such as bands and a cappella groups.

Waterfront and sports
All waterfront staff are certified lifeguards, and many have a history of competitive swimming or boating.

Ramah Poconos boasts excellent sports facilities, including a newly reconstructed baseball field and three basketball courts. Programs include the two-day color war, and the campers between Notzetzim (entering 5th grade), and Machon, (campers entering 9th grade) are divided into four colors and participate in dozens of Olympic and made-up mini-games during the second session only (mid-July to mid-August).

Tikvah Family Camp
The Tikvah Family Camp is a five-day overnight program that provides Jewish children with developmental disorders and/or social learning disorders, their parents, and their siblings the opportunity to experience together a  Jewish summer camp.

See also
Conservative Judaism
United Synagogue Youth
Camp Ramah

References

External links

The National Ramah Commission
"Research Findings on the Impact of Camp Ramah," 2004
Records of the National Ramah Commission, 1951–89
Ramah Poconos Facebook Page

Poconos
Buildings and structures in Wayne County, Pennsylvania
Pocono Mountains
Youth organizations based in Pennsylvania
1950 establishments in Pennsylvania
Ramah in the Poconos
Zionism in the United States